SMAC may refer to:

Biology and medicine
Second mitochondria-derived activator of caspases or Diablo homolog, a component of the apoptosis pathway
Sequential Multiple Analysis - Computer or comprehensive metabolic panel, a panel of clinical chemistry lab tests
Supramolecular activation cluster, the structure comprising the immunological synapse

Other uses
Sabang Merauke Raya Air Charter, an Indonesian airline
Sid Meier's Alpha Centauri, a computer game
Southern Maryland Athletic Conference
Southwestern Michigan Athletic Conference
Stone Mountain Arts Center, an arts center in Brownville, Maine, United States, North America
Supreme Macedonian-Adrianople Committee
Social Mobile Analytics Cloud, also called as the third platform by IDC indicates a technology milestone

See also
FBi SMAC Awards, Awards given by Sydney radio station FBi
Smack (disambiguation)